Satinka is a rural locality (a settlement) and the administrative center of Sampursky District, Tambov Oblast, Russia. Population:

References

Notes

Sources

Rural localities in Tambov Oblast